UDP-N-acetyl-2-amino-2-deoxyglucuronate dehydrogenase (WlbA, WbpB) is an enzyme with systematic name UDP-N-acetyl-2-amino-2-deoxy-alpha-D-glucuronate:NAD+ 3-oxidoreductase. This enzyme catalyses the following chemical reaction:

 UDP-N-acetyl-2-amino-2-deoxy-alpha-D-glucuronate + NAD+  UDP-2-acetamido-2-deoxy-alpha-D-ribo-hex-3-uluronate + NADH + H+

This enzyme participates in the biosynthesis of lipopolysaccharide UDP-alpha-D-ManNAc3NAcA.

References

External links 
 

EC 1.1.1